Dominik Friedrich Schad (born 4 March 1997) is a German professional footballer who plays as a defender for 1. FC Kaiserslautern.

References

External links
 
 

German footballers
1997 births
Living people
People from Aschaffenburg
Sportspeople from Lower Franconia
Germany youth international footballers
Association football defenders
SpVgg Greuther Fürth players
1. FC Kaiserslautern players
2. Bundesliga players
3. Liga players
Footballers from Bavaria
21st-century German people